Johann Christian Kittel (18 February 1732 – 17 April 1809) was a German organist, composer, and teacher. He was one of the last students of Johann Sebastian Bach. His students included Michael Gotthard Fischer, Karl Gottlieb Umbreit, Johann Wilhelm Hässler and Christian Heinrich Rinck.

Biography
Kittel was born and died in Erfurt. He first studied with Jakob Adlung. He moved to Leipzig in 1748 and was a favourite - and last - pupil of Johann Sebastian Bach until his death two years later. He was appointed organist and teacher in Langensalza in 1751, following which he returned to Erfurt as organist of the Barfüßerkirche, in 1756, moving to the Predigerkirche in 1762.

He refused many generous and more munificent offers, including one in 1790 from Duchess Anna Amalia of Saxe-Weimar to travel to Italy, remaining in Erfurt for the rest of his life. He played many evening recitals there and was famous as a virtuoso organist; Goethe, Herder, and Wieland all went to hear him play, and he made a concert tour to Hamburg in 1800, remaining there for a year while preparing a book of chorales for Schleswig-Holstein.

Compositions
He considered himself to be "grounded in the principles of Bach" and aimed "to awaken, maintain and heighten feelings of devotion in the hearts of his hearers by means of music". His teaching and composition fulfilled this aim by a restriction to simple forms which were best suited to liturgical use. He wrote some large-scale organ works such as double chorale variations based on Bach's examples, though he was influenced by the contemporary galant style, with a strong emphasis on melody. His piano sonatas of 1789 have features in common with the Viennese classical school.

Piano
6 Sonaten ... nebst einer Fantasie (Gera, 1789)
6 Veränderungen, über ... Nicht so traurig (Saint Petersburg, 1797)

Organ

Der angehende praktische Organist, oder Anweisung zum zweckmässigen Gebrauch der Orgel bei Gottesverehrungen in Beispielen, textbook, 3 volumes (Erfurt, 1801–1808)
Vierstimmige Choräle mit Vorspielen ... für die Schleswig-Hollsteinischen Kirchen, 2 volumes (Altona, 1803)
24 Choräle mit 8 verschiedenen Bässen über eine Melodie, ed. J. C. H. Rinck (Offenbach, 1811)
Grosse Präludien, 2 volumes (Leipzig)
24 kurze Choralvorspiele (Offenbach)
Variationen über 2 Choräle (Leipzig)
24 leichte Choral-Vorspiele (Bonn and Cologne)

Sources
Karl Gustav Fellerer: "Kittel, Johann Christian", Grove Music Online, ed. L. Macy (accessed 13 June 2007).

Further reading
A. Dreetz: Johann Christian Kittel, der letzte Bach-schüler (Berlin, 1932)
J. P. Anthony: The Organ Works of Johann Christian Kittel (dissertation, Yale University, 1978)
J. Burg: "Johann Christian Kittel (1732–1809), un grand pédagogue de l'orgue, maillon important dans la tradition de Jean-Sébastien Bach", in L’orgue: cahiers et mémoires, no. 228 (1993)

External links

German male classical composers
German Baroque composers
German Classical-period composers
German classical organists
German male organists
German classical pianists
Male classical pianists
Musicians from Erfurt
1732 births
1809 deaths
Pupils of Johann Sebastian Bach
18th-century keyboardists
German pianists
German male pianists
19th-century German male musicians
Male classical organists